Berkelic acid is a fungal isolate with anticancer activity in vitro. It was first discovered in the fungal species Euglena mutabilis, which evolved to live in the Berkeley Pit.

Notes

Carboxylic acids
Oxygen heterocycles
Methyl esters
Ketones
Heterocyclic compounds with 3 rings
Spiro compounds